The chapters of the Japanese manga series Mars were written and illustrated by Fuyumi Soryo. The series premiered in Bessatsu Friend in 1996, where it ran until its conclusion in 2000. The chapters were collected and published in 15 tankōbon volumes by Kodansha. The first volume was published on May 13, 1996; the last on December 13, 2000. A short prequel series, Mars: A Horse With No Name, was serialized in the same magazine in 1999, and its chapters were published in a single tankōbon volume on December 9, 1999. From October 12, 2006, through January 12, 2007, Kodansha republished the series in Japan across eight kanzenban special edition volumes, collecting more chapters in each volume.

The manga series was licensed for an English language release in North America by Tokyopop. The first five chapters were serialized in Smile starting in the October 2001 issue, and running until the March 2001 issue. which published all fifteen volumes from April 23, 2003, through November 11, 2003. It released A Horse With No Name on July 13, 2004.  Both titles are now considered "out of print" by Tokyopop.

Volume list

Mars

Mars: Horse With No Name

References

Mars chapters